The 1891 Georgetown football team represented the Georgetown University during the 1891 college football season.  Georgetown finished the season with a 2–2 record.  For the first time in their history, Georgetown had a coach, Tommy Dowd, who also played baseball for the Washington Senators.  They played home games at Boundary Park, also the home venue for the Senators.

Schedule

References

Georgetown
Georgetown Hoyas football seasons
Georgetown football